Watertown Square is the main square of Watertown, Massachusetts, located at the confluence of North Beacon Street and Main Street (US-20), Mt. Auburn Street (MA-16), Pleasant Street, Arsenal Street, and Charles River Road.

Bus service
Watertown Square is a minor transfer point for MBTA bus services. Two routes terminate at a two-lane bus loop that forms the west side of the square; the 71 is one of four trolleybus routes operated from the Harvard bus tunnel and a key bus route.
: –Watertown Square
: Watertown Square–

One additional route passes on the north side of the square on US-20; it serves a westbound stop just north of Watertown Square, and an eastbound stop a block to the west.
: Market Place Drive or Waltham Center–Central Square, Cambridge

Trolleybus wires for the 71 run to Watertown Yard, which at times has been used as a depot for the trolleybuses. From June through December 1984, the 71 and 70 short turns were extended to Watertown Yard during reconstruction at the square.

Railroad station
The Watertown Branch Railroad opened through Watertown Square in 1847. Passenger service on the line ended on July 9, 1938, and the second track was removed by early 1940. The middle section of the line from the Waltham/Watertown line through Watertown Square to East Watertown was abandoned in 1960. The former Watertown station was reused as a lumber company by 1968, but later demolished.

References

External links

MBTA bus
Buildings and structures in Watertown, Massachusetts
Bus stations in Middlesex County, Massachusetts